The Hill is a 1965 British prison drama film directed by Sidney Lumet, set in an army prison in North Africa at the end of the Second World War. It stars Sean Connery, Harry Andrews, Ian Bannen, Ossie Davis, Ian Hendry, Alfred Lynch, Roy Kinnear and Michael Redgrave.

Plot
In a British Army "glasshouse" (military prison) in the Libyan desert, prisoners convicted of service offences such as insubordination, being drunk while on duty, going AWOL or petty theft are subjected to repetitive drill routines as a punishment in the blazing desert heat.

The arrival of five new prisoners slowly leads to a clash with the camp authorities. One new NCO guard (Williams) who has also just arrived employs excessive punishments, which include forcing the five newcomers to repeatedly climb a man-made hill in the centre of the camp. When one dies, a power struggle erupts between brutal ex-civilian prison guard Staff Sergeant Williams (Ian Hendry), humane Staff Sergeant Harris (Ian Bannen), Regimental Sergeant Major Wilson (Harry Andrews), and the camp's medical officer (Michael Redgrave) as they struggle to run the camp in conflicting styles.

Roberts (Sean Connery) is a former squadron sergeant major from the Royal Tank Regiment, convicted of assaulting his commanding officer – which he explains to his fellow inmates was because he was ordered to lead his men in a senseless suicidal attack. Roberts openly scorns Williams' brutality and serves as a challenge to his authority. Like Roberts, the RSM is a career soldier and commands authority within the prison in which he is working. However, he is realistic about his role stating, "No one's going to pin a medal on us". He sees his duty to be as important as any other – that of breaking down failed soldiers, then building them back up again, in his words, "Into men!"

The other members of Roberts' group are McGrath, a hard Yorkshireman serving a sentence for drunkenness, fighting and assaulting members of the Military Police. Army office clerk Stevens, a timid and naive man jailed for going AWOL. Bartlett, a spiv who shirks active service and has been jailed for selling Army vehicle tyres to the Arabs, and the light-hearted King, a West Indian soldier serving a sentence for stealing three bottles of whisky from the sergeants' mess, and being drunk and disorderly.

Staff Sergeant Williams' ambition is matched only by his cruel treatment of the prisoners; he seeks to use their suffering as a means for promotion. When Roberts is accused of cowardice, he asks Staff Sergeant Williams, "And what are you supposed to be – a brave man in a permanent base job?" The RSM also questions Staff Sergeant Williams's motives for getting out of London, as in another scene, he slyly mentions the fact that the Germans were bombing the UK (including the civilian prison Williams worked at) just as Williams was volunteering for prison duty in Africa. Staff Sergeant Williams openly admits that he is trying to impress the RSM by showing that he has got what it takes to do the job, and attempts to undermine the RSM with a late-night drinking contest.

Staff Sergeant Harris is the conscience of the prison who sympathises with the men and really wants no part of his being there. The RSM believes that Harris is far too lenient. The officers, both the CO (Norman Bird) and the medical officer, take their duties casually and, as Roberts points out, "everyone is doing time here, even the screws" (prison officers).

When the medical officer confronts the RSM with the claim that Stevens' punishment is too severe, the RSM turns this around and blames the MO as it was he who passed Stevens as "fit for punishment".

Williams is a bully and a coward and singles out Bartlett and Stevens who are the two weakest members of the group, particularly Stevens. Stevens finally loses his mind and dies of heat exhaustion after repeated and unwarranted punishments by Williams, and the whole prison rises in protest. Roberts openly accuses Staff Sergeant Williams of murdering Stevens. King corroborates the story. However, this results in both being punished.  The RSM has the experience to deal with a potentially violent situation. Firstly by stating that the ring-leaders will be charged with mutiny (an offence punishable by death). "Who are the ring-leaders" shouts one prisoner. The RSM relies with a stern "Every fifth man!". The RSM thus gaining control, eases the situation whereby the prisoners willingly break up the revolt. Meanwhile, with the help of two prison guard corporals, Staff Williams beat up Roberts in an empty solitary cell. Roberts suffers a broken foot and Harris gets him carried to see the medical officer. The RSM intervenes and orders Roberts to march despite his injury. King again protests, and after being subjected to racial abuse by the RSM refuses to wear the uniform or acknowledge any form of army discipline.

The MO and Staff Sergeant Harris insist on reporting the abuses at the camp whilst the RSM and Williams join forces in an attempt to intimidate them into backing down. The injured Roberts is left alone in the cell and Williams remains behind. He then prepares to administer one final, perhaps fatal, beating to Roberts, when King and McGrath enter the cell, proceed to attack Williams, and are heard to severely beat him (off-camera). Roberts pleads with them to stop, knowing that if prisoners beat up a prison officer, any case they may have had against him is lost.

Cast

 Sean Connery as (ex-Sergeant Major) Trooper Joe Roberts (Royal Tank Regiment) 
 Harry Andrews as Regimental Sergeant Major Bert Wilson (Scots Guards) 
 Ian Bannen as Staff Sergeant Charlie Harris (Royal East Kent Regiment)
 Ian Hendry as Staff Sergeant Williams (East Surrey Regiment)  
 Alfred Lynch as Private George Stevens (Royal West Kent Regiment)  
 Ossie Davis as Private Jacko King (Royal Pioneer Corps)  
 Roy Kinnear as Private Monty Bartlett (Royal Fusiliers)
 Jack Watson as Private Jock McGrath (Lancashire Fusiliers) 
 Sir Michael Redgrave as the Medical Officer (a captain)
 Norman Bird as the Commandant (a major)
 Neil McCarthy as Staff Sergeant Burton 
 Howard Goorney as Trooper Walters (Royal Tank Regiment) 
 Tony Caunter as Trooper Martin (Royal Tank Regiment)

Production
The film was based on a screenplay by Ray Rigby, who wrote for TV and had spent time in military prison. Movie rights were bought by Seven Arts Productions, which had a production deal with MGM. Producer Kenneth Hyman arranged for Rigby's script to be rewritten by other people, but when Sidney Lumet came on board as director, Lumet went back to Rigby's original draft. He and Rigby did cut out around 100 pages of material before filming.

"There really isn't a lot of story", said Lumet. "It's all character – a group of men, prisoners and jailers alike, driven by the same motive force, fear."

Sean Connery agreed to play the lead because it represented such a change of pace from James Bond. "It is only because of my reputation as Bond that the backers put up the money for The Hill", he said.

Lumet says he told Connery before filming began that, "'I'm going to make brutal demands of you, physically and emotionally', and he knew I'm not a director who has too much respect for 'stars' as such. The result is beyond my hopes. He is real and tough and not at all smooth or nice. In a way he's a 'heavy' but the real heavy is the Army."

Filming took place in Almería, Spain starting 8 September 1964. An old Spanish fort in Málaga was used for the prison. Many people associated with the production had regarded the filming as pleasant, despite difficult conditions: Temperatures went above 46 °C (114 °F) and nearly all the cast and crew became ill, even though thousands of gallons of fresh water were brought in.

The Hill did not perform well in cinemas, although it received excellent reviews and Ray Rigby's screenplay won at the 1965 Cannes Film Festival. The film has a 71% rating on Rotten Tomatoes.

Rigby published a novel of the story in 1965.

Awards

BAFTA Awards
 Winner Best British Cinematography (Oswald Morris)
 Nominee Best Film (Kenneth Hyman)
 Nominee Best British Film (Kenneth Hyman)
 Nominee Best British Actor (Harry Andrews)
 Nominee Best British Screenplay (Ray Rigby)
 Nominee Best British Art Direction (Herbert Smith)

Cannes Film Festival
The film screened at the 1965 Cannes Film Festival.
 Winner Best Screenplay at the 1965 Festival (Ray Rigby)

National Board of Review
 Winner Best Supporting Actor (Harry Andrews)

Writers' Guild of Great Britain
 Winner Best British Dramatic Screenplay Award (Ray Rigby)

DVD
The Hill was released to DVD by Warner Home Video on 5 June 2007 as a Region 1 widescreen DVD.

References

External links
 
 
 
 
 

1965 films
1965 drama films
1965 war films
1960s prison films
British prison drama films
British war drama films
1960s war drama films
British films based on plays
Films directed by Sidney Lumet
Metro-Goldwyn-Mayer films
North African campaign films
Films shot in Almería
Films shot at MGM-British Studios
1960s English-language films
1960s British films
Films about the British Army